Titus Interactive SA, known as Titus France SA until March 1999, was a French software publisher that produced and published video games for various platforms. Its head office was located in Parc de l'Esplanade in Lagny sur Marne in Greater Paris. At one time, it was instead located in Montfermeil, also in Greater Paris.

The company's mascot was Titus, the title character of Titus the Fox.

History
The company was founded by brothers Eric Caen and Hervé Caen in France in 1985.

In 1991, Titus purchased Palace Software, the gaming division of the Palace Group.

In 1998, the company purchased the developers BlueSky Software and Digital Integration Ltd.

In late-1999, the company acquired shares in struggling publisher Interplay Entertainment, including a stake in publisher/distributor Virgin Interactive.

In 2001, Titus took the control of Interplay.

In May 2001, Titus signed a distribution deal with Microids for the United States. One year later, Titus Japan K.K. signed a similar distribution deal with Konami for Japan.

In June 2004, Titus filed for bankruptcy, declaring an unseeable future for Interplay. On January 9, 2005, a French district commercial court declared Titus bankrupt with a €33 million (US$43.8 million) debt. Titus' French subsidiaries were later closed down, while their assets were soon purchased by Interplay.

Games
Titus began releasing titles for home computers such as the Amiga, Amstrad CPC, Atari ST, Commodore 64, ZX Spectrum and PC before moving on to consoles like the Sega Master System, Super Nintendo Entertainment System, Game Boy and Game Boy Color, PlayStation, Sega Dreamcast and Nintendo 64, followed by publishing titles for the GameCube, PlayStation 2 and Xbox.

Titus designed games such as Virtual Kasparov, Automobili Lamborghini, Virtual Chess 64, Roadsters (the Nintendo 64 version), Incredible Crisis (developed by Polygon Magic), Prehistorik Man and Lamborghini American Challenge, that were given positive reviews. Titus however was also involved in the creation of games that were notable due to their negative reception. Superman for the Nintendo 64 was notorious for its negative status among gamers. GameTrailers called it the worst game of all time. As of 2018, it holds a score of 23% at GameRankings. Similarly, the 2003 game RoboCop also received negative reviews. GameSpot gave it 2.2/10 saying "RoboCop has a bevy of horrible problems that render the game practically unplayable".

1988
 Crazy Cars
 Fire and Forget
 Galactic Conqueror
 Off Shore Warrior
1989
 Crazy Cars 2
 Titan
 Knight Force
1990
 Crime Does not Pay
 Dark Century
 Dick Tracy
 Fire & Forget II
 Un Indien dans la ville (Little Indian: An Indian in the City for US release), developed by TF1 Video and Titus
 Wild Streets
1991
 The Blues Brothers
 Prehistorik
1992
 Battlestorm
 Crazy Cars 3
 Titus the Fox (aka Moktar)
1993
 Ardy Lightfoot (developed by ASCII and published by Titus in North America)
 Prehistorik 2
 Super Cauldron
1994
 Monster Max
 Lamborghini American Challenge
 Quik the Thunder Rabbit
1996
 Virtual Chess
 Virtual Chess II
 Metal Rage
 The Brainies
 Incantation
 Oscar (SNES version)
 Power Piggs of the Dark Age
 Prehistorik Man
 Prince of Persia 2: The Shadow and the Flame (SNES version)
1997
 Virtual Chess 64
 Superman
 Automobili Lamborghini
1998
 Quest for Camelot (published by Nintendo America Inc.)
1999
 Rival Realms (developed by Activ Pub)
 Roadsters
 Superman
 Evil Zone (developed by YUKE's Future Media Creators)
 Xena: Warrior Princess: The Talisman of Fate (developed by Saffire)

2000
 Incredible Crisis
 Hercules: The Legendary Journeys
 Carmageddon 64
 Blues Brothers 2000
 Superman (cancelled PlayStation video game)
 Kao the Kangaroo (Dreamcast version)
 F/A-18E Super Hornet

2001
 Kao the Kangaroo (PC and GBA versions)
 Rox (GBA version only)
 Top Gun: Combat Zones (PS2 version)
 Top Gun: Firestorm
 Virtual Kasparov
 Original War (published under Virgin Interactive name, Titus distributing the game in North America)
 Worms World Party
 Exhibition of Speed
 X'Treme Roller
 Jimmy White's Cueball World
 Codename: Outbreak (published under Virgin Interactive name; Titus distributing the game in North America)
 Sgt. Cruise
 Xena: Warrior Princess
 Planet Monsters
 Hands of Time
 Stunt GP

2002
 Nightstone (published under Virgin Interactive name, Titus distributing the game in North America)
 Virtual Kasparov (Game Boy Advance version)
 Tir et But: Edition Champions du Monde
 Barbarian (PlayStation 2 version)
 Top Gun: Combat Zones (GameCube version)
 Top Gun: Firestorm Advance
 Downforce

2003
 Barbarian (Xbox and GameCube versions)
 Top Gun: Combat Zones (Europe-only PC version)
 RoboCop

2004
 Top Gun: Combat Zones (Game Boy Advance version)

Subsidiaries
Titus had several subsidiaries. The United States subsidiary, Titus Software Corporation, had its head office in Chatsworth, Los Angeles. The Japanese subsidiary, Titus Japan K.K., had its head office on the eighth floor of the Kotubuki Dogenzaka Building in Dōgenzaka (JA), Shibuya, Tokyo. The UK subsidiary, Titus Software UK Limited, had its head office in Leamington Spa, Warwickshire.

References

External links

 Titus Interactive (Archive)
 Titus Games (Archive)

 
Defunct video game companies of France
Video game companies established in 1985
Video game companies disestablished in 2005
Video game development companies
Video game publishers
French companies established in 1985
French companies disestablished in 2005